The 2022 Tameside Metropolitan Borough Council election took place on 5 May 2022 to elect members of Tameside Metropolitan Borough Council. This was on the same day as other local elections. 19 of the 57 seats were up for election.

Background
Since its creation in 1974, Tameside has always been under Labour control, aside from 1978 to 1982 when the Conservatives held a majority. In the most recent election in 2021, Labour lost one seat to the Conservatives, but increased their vote share by 4.6%, winning a total of 16 seats, with the Conservatives gaining 10.7% and winning 3 seats. The Green Party of England and Wales did not gain any seats, despite winning their first seat in 2019.

The positions up for election in 2021 were last elected in 2018. In that election, Labour achieved 53.8% of the vote, and won 17 seats with 1 gained from the Conservatives, while the Conservatives won 2 with 1 gain from Labour.

Previous council composition

Results

Results by ward
An asterisk indicates an incumbent councillor.

Ashton Hurst

Ashton St. Michael's

Ashton Waterloo

Audenshaw

Denton North East

Denton South

Denton West

Droylsden East

Droylsden West

Dukinfield

Dukinfield Stalybridge

Hyde Godley

Hyde Newton

Hyde Werneth

Longdendale

Mossley

St. Peters

Stalybridge North

Stalybridge South

References

Tameside
Tameside Council elections